Frank Strickland Shofner (July 23, 1919 – October 10, 1998) was a third baseman in Major League Baseball. Listed at 5' 10.5", 187 lb.; he batted left-handed and threw right-handed.

A native of Crawford, Texas, Shofner played briefly for the Boston Red Sox during the  season. In five games, he was a .154 hitter (2-for-13) with one run and one triple without home runs or RBI.

At the end of the season, Shofner was sent by Boston along with pitcher Tommy Fine to Triple-A San Francisco Seals in exchange for utility player Neill Sheridan.

Shofner died in his hometown of Crawford, Texas, at the age of 79.

External links

Retrosheet

Boston Red Sox players
Major League Baseball third basemen
San Francisco Seals (baseball) players
Baseball players from Texas
1919 births
1998 deaths
People from Crawford, Texas